The Great Plains Transportation Museum is a railroad museum in Wichita, Kansas, United States.

Collection
The museum's collection includes 6 locomotives and several pieces of rolling stock used on freight and passenger trains.
 Atchison, Topeka and Santa Fe Railway 4-8-4 steam locomotive #3768.
 Atchison, Topeka and Santa Fe Railway EMD SDFP45 diesel locomotive.
 Burlington Northern Railroad EMD NW2 diesel locomotive #421 (Ex-St. Louis - San Francisco Railway #261)
 Various other diesel locomotives
 An electric locomotive
 A drover's car
 A tank car
 Maintenance of way equipment
 A Postal storage car
 A heavyweight baggage car
 Various types of cabooses

External links
 Great Plains Transportation Museum Website
 ATSF 4-8-4 3768 info at the Santa Fe Subjects site-By Evan Werkema
 Photos and history on FP45 #93-By Jim Fuhrman
 Preservation project for Santa Fe FP-45 #93

References

Railroad museums in Kansas
Museums in Wichita, Kansas